The Psychidae (bagworm moths, also simply bagworms or bagmoths) are a family of the Lepidoptera (butterflies and moths). The bagworm family is fairly small, with about 1,350 species described. Bagworm species are found globally, with some, such as the snailcase bagworm (Apterona helicoidella), in modern times settling continents where they are not native.

Another common name for the Psychidae is "case moths", but this is just as well used for the case-bearers (Coleophoridae). The names refer to the habits of caterpillars of these two families, which build small protective cases in which they can hide. The bagworms belong to the superfamily Tineoidea, which is a basal lineage of the Ditrysia (as is Gelechioidea, which includes case-bearers). This means that the bagworms and case-bearers are only as closely related to each other as either is to butterflies (Rhopalocera).

Most bagworms are inoffensive to humans and inconspicuous; some are occasional nuisance pests. However, a few species can become more serious pests, and have caused significant damage e.g. to wattle (Acacia mearnsii) in South Africa and orange (Citrus × sinensis) in Florida. If detected early, picking the cases from the trees while in their pupa stage is an effective way to check an infestation; otherwise, insecticides are used. One bagworm species, the fangalabola (Deborrea malgassa) of Madagascar, is in some places encouraged to breed on wattle trees, because its pupae are collected as a protein-rich food.

Description
The caterpillar larvae of the Psychidae construct cases out of silk and environmental materials such as sand, soil, lichen, or plant materials. These cases are attached to rocks, trees or fences while resting or during their pupa stage, but are otherwise mobile. The larvae of some species eat lichen, while others prefer green leaves. In many species, the adult females lack wings and are therefore difficult to identify accurately. Case-bearer cases are usually much smaller, flimsier, and consist mainly of silk, while bagworm "bags" resemble caddisfly cases in their outward appearance – a mass of (mainly) plant detritus spun together with silk on the inside.

Bagworm cases range in size from less than 1 cm to 15 cm among some tropical species. Each species makes a case particular to its species, making the case more useful to identify the species than the creature itself. Cases among the more primitive species are flat. More specialized species exhibit a greater variety of case size, shape, and composition, usually narrowing on both ends. The attachment substance used to affix the bag to host plant, or structure, can be very strong, sometimes requiring a great deal of force to remove. Body markings are rare. Adult females of many bagworm species are larviform, with only vestigial wings, legs, and mouthparts. In some species, parthenogenesis is known. The adult males of most species are strong fliers with well-developed wings and feathery antennae but survive only long enough to reproduce due to underdeveloped mouthparts that prevent them from feeding. Most male bagworm wings have few of the scales characteristic of most moths, instead having a thin covering of hairs.

Ecology
In the larval stage, bagworms extend their head and thorax from their mobile case to devour the leaves of host plants, often leading to the death of their hosts. Trees infested with bagworms exhibit increasingly damaged foliage as the infestation increases until the leaves are stripped bare. Some bagworms are specialized in their host plants (monophagous), while others can feed on a variety of plant species (polyphagous). A few species also consume small arthropods (such as the camphor scale Pseudaonidia duplex, a scale insect). One bagworm species was found to eat an orb-web of Plebs sachalinensis (Araneae, Araneidae) entirely.

Since bagworm cases are composed of silk and the materials from their habitat, they are naturally camouflaged from predators. Predators include birds and other insects. Birds often eat the egg-laden bodies of female bagworms after they have died. Since the eggs are very hard-shelled, they can pass through the bird's digestive system unharmed, promoting the spread of the species over wide areas. 

A bagworm begins to build its case as soon as it hatches. Once the case is built, only adult males ever leave the case, never to return, when they take flight to find a mate. Bagworms add material to the front of the case as they grow, excreting waste materials through the opening in the back of the case.  When satiated with leaves, a bagworm caterpillar secures its case and pupates. The adult female, which is wingless, either emerges from the case long enough for breeding or remains in the case while the male extends his abdomen into the female's case to breed. Females lay their eggs in their case and die. The female evergreen bagworm (Thyridopteryx ephemeraeformis) dies without laying eggs, and the larval bagworm offspring emerge from the parent's body. Some bagworm species are parthenogenetic, meaning their eggs develop without male fertilization. Each bagworm generation lives just long enough as adults to mate and reproduce in their annual cycle.

Systematics 
Ten subfamilies and about 240 genera are recognized among the bagworms.

The subfamilies of Psychidae, with some notable genera and species also listed, are:

Subfamily Epichnopteriginae 
 Acentra
 Bijugis
 Epichnopterix
 Epichnopterix plumella
 Heliopsychidea
 Mauropterix
 Montanima
 Psychidea
 Psychocentra
 Rebelia
 Reisseronia
 Stichobasis
 Stichobasis postmeridianus
 Whittleia
 Whittleia retiella
Subfamily Naryciinae
 Dahlica Enderlein, 1912
 Dahlica triquetrella
 Eosolenobia Filipjev, 1924
 Narycia
 Postsolenobia Meier, 1958
 Siederia
Subfamily Oiketicinae
 Apterona
 Apterona helicoidella – (snailcase bagworm)
 Canephora
 Canephora hirsuta
 Cryptothelea (= Platoeceticus)
 Cryptothelea gloverii
 Astala
 Kotochalia
 Kotochalia junodi – (wattle bagworm)
 Hyalarcta

 Deborrea
 Deborrea malgassa – (fangalabola)
 Eumeta
 Eumeta crameri – (faggot worm)
 Megalophanes
 Megalophanes viciella
 Oiketicus
 Zamopsyche
 Eucoloneura
 Pachythelia

 Phalacropterix

 Ptilocephala
 Ptilocephala plumifera
 Sterrhopterix
 Sterrhopterix fusca
 Thyridopteryx

Subfamily Placodominae
 Placodoma
Subfamily Psychinae
 Liothula
 Liothula omnivora
 Luffia
 Luffia ferchaultella
 Luffia lapidella
 Psyche
 Psyche casta
 Psyche crassiorella
 Psyche rassei
 Psyche saxicolella
 Prochalia
Subfamily Taleporiinae
 Bankesia Tutt, 1899
 Bankesia conspurcatella
 Brevantennia Sieder, 1953
 Cebysa
 Cebysa leucotelus – (Australian bagmoth)
 Diplodoma
 Diplodoma adspersella
 Eotaleporia Sauter, 1986
 Praesolenobia Sieder, 1954
 Pseudobankesia Meier, 1963
 Sciopetris Meyrick, 1891
 Taleporia
Subfamily Typhoniinae
 Typhonia
 Typhonia animosa
 Typhonia bimaculata

Incertae sedis
 Eumasia 
 Eumasia crisostomella
 Eumasia parietariella (Heydenreich, 1851)
 Iphierga
 Iphierga chrysophaes  Turner, 1917 
Subfamily Scoriodytinae
Scoriodyta Meyrick, 1888
 Scoriodyta conisalia Meyrick, 1888
Subfamily Metisinae
Metisa Hampson, 1895
 Metisa canifrons Hampson, 1895
Subfamily Pseudarbelinae
Pseudarbela Sauber, 1902
 Pseudarbela celaena (Bethune-Baker, 1904)
 Pseudarbela aurea (Bethune-Baker, 1904)
 Pseudarbela papuana Clench, 1959
 Pseudarbela semperi Sauber, 1902
Casana Walker, 1865
 Casana trochiloides Walker, 1865
Linggana Roepke, 1957
 Linggana cardinaali Roepke, 1957

References

External links

 Bagworm, Fall Webworm or Eastern Tent Caterpillar? , August 18, 2001.  Sandra Mason, University of Illinois Extension.  Accessed May 31, 2010.
 Bagworm Control, Photos and Video from University of Nebraska-Lincoln Extension
 Bagworm fact sheet from Penn State
 Psychids Accessed 2002-06-26
 Bagworm Silk cases

Psychidae
Moth families